Nothing Else Than Air is a Mexican film documentary that plans to release in theaters in the autumn of 2012 in Mexico. The film is directed by Mexican director Carlos Hernández Vázquez and produced by E Corp Studio in association with Media Mac, and was shot in high definition digital cinema.

Plot
Gabriel Nájera aka "El Apenas" (65 y.o.) has been selling balloons 24 hours a day for 25 years in a Mexico Cityʼs small park. He promised his wife, go back to home when ensure their children's all the way to the university. Even he has achieved his objective, he refuse to return home.

Cast 
 Gabriel Nájera aka "El Apenas"
 Maribel Villegas, Gabriel's wife.
 Gabriel Nájera Villegas, son.
 Maribel Nájera Villegas, daughter.

Awards 
Festival Latinoamericano y Caribeño de Cine de Margarita 2015
Black Movie Festival de Films 2015
Riviera Maya Film Festival 2014
IMCINE : Fondo para la Producción Cinematográfica de Calidad 2011
Doc Meeting Argentina 2011
Bolivia Lab 2011
Iberdoc 2010
International Film Crossing Borders 2010

References

External links 
 

2010s Spanish-language films
Mexican documentary films
2010 films
2010s Mexican films